The 1989 Buenos Aires Grand Prix was held at Buenos Aires on December 17, 1989, in the Autódromo Oscar Alfredo Gálvez.

Classification 

Buenos Aires Grand Prix
1989 in motorsport
1989 in Argentine motorsport
December 1989 sports events in South America